North Klang Straits Bypass, Federal Route 20, AH 141, is the main highway bypass to Port Klang in Klang, Selangor, Malaysia. Federal Route 20 became the backbone of the road system linking Sungai Rasau to Port Klang before being surpassed by the New North Klang Straits Bypass 30. Many cargo trucks travel along the highway daily.

Route background
The Kilometre Zero of the Federal Route 20 starts at Northport Interchange near Port Klang.

History

The plan to build the bypass to Port Klang began in the late 1970s. Construction began in 1983 and completed on 1 January 1985. Today this highway are maintained by the Lebuhraya Shapadu Sdn Bhd (a member of Shapadu Corporation Sdn Bhd) and Malaysian Public Works Department (JKR). By the 1990s to 2000s, the highway was bogged down with severe congestion, and the present New North Klang Straits Bypass was built to replace it. On 2009, the Port Klang toll plaza was closed and the parts of Jalan Kapar – Port Klang sections became a toll free highway.

In 2014, the expressway was taken over to LGB Group and its name was changed to Grand Sepadu Sdn Bhd.

Features

Two-lane carriageway
Emergency lane
Toll
Speed trap
Variable Message Sign (VMS)
Many container trucks along this highway
Many kampungs (village) along this highway
Massive accident area along this highway
Many traffic lights along this highway

At most sections, the Federal Route 20 was built under the JKR R5 road standard, with a speed limit of 90 km/h.

There are no alternate routes or sections with motorcycle lanes.

Overlaps
Northport, Port Klang – Port Klang toll plaza : E30 New North Klang Straits Bypass
Bukit Raja toll plaza – Sungai Rasau : E30 New North Klang Straits Bypass

Criticisms

Accident area near school 
The bypass is not considered safe because of many accidents involving heavy vehicles along this road, especially the area around a school. On 18 May 2005, on Teacher's Day, a seven-year-old girl from Sekolah Rendah Agama Rantau Panjang religious school Nur Salina Saparedi was knocked by a lorry while she was crossing this road.

 (Source: The Star, 19 May 2005)

Toll rates

Bukit Raja toll plaza

List of interchanges (southeast-northwest)

See also
 New North Klang Straits Bypass

References

External links
Shapadu

Highways in Malaysia
Expressways and highways in the Klang Valley
Klang (city)